Selva, Pama y Cerro is an album by Argentine singer and guitarist Atahualpa Yupanqui. It was released in 1964 on the Odeon label. It was the No. 1 album in Argentina in 1964.

Track listing
Side A
 "Zamba de Vergas" (traditional)
 "La Alabanza" (Atahualpa Yupanqui - Hermanos Díaz)
 "Los Dos Abuelos" (Atahualpa Yupanqui - Pablo del Cerro)
 "Canción para Doña Guillermina" (Atahualpa Yupanqui)
 "La Vengo a Dejar" (Atahualpa Yupanqui)
 "Zamba del Pajuerano" (Atahualpa Yupanqui, Pablo del Cerro)

Side B
 "Los Yuyitos de Mi Tierra" (Romildo Risso, Atahualpa Yupanqui)
 "Duerme Negrito" (traditional)
 "Payo Sola" Atahualpa Yupanqui - Pablo del Cerro)
 "Sin Caballo y en Montiel" (Atahualpa Yupanqui, Pablo del Cerro)
 "La Tristecita" (Osvaldo Sosa Cordero, Ariel Ramírez) 
 "El Niño Duerme Sonriendo" (Manuel Benítez Carrasco, Atahualpa Yupanqui)

References

1958 albums
Atahualpa Yupanqui albums